The Grampian 28 is a Canadian sailboat, that was designed by Rolf van der Sleen and first built in 1975.

Production

The boat was built by Grampian Marine in Oakville, Ontario, Canada starting in 1975 and 107 examples were completed, but it is now out of production.

The Grampian 28 design was later developed into the Intrepid 28 and built by Intrepid Yachts, a division of Cape Dory Yachts, using the same tooling.

Design
The Grampian 28 is a recreational keelboat, built predominantly of fiberglass, with wood trim. It has a masthead sloop rig, a skeg-mounted rudder and a fixed fin keel. It displaces  and carries  of ballast.

The design is fitted with a Swedish Volvo diesel engine.

The boat has a PHRF racing average handicap of 195 with a high of 186 and low of 204.

Operational history
In a review Michael McGoldrick wrote, "The Grampian 28 is more contemporary and nicer looking than the other Grampian models... Although it has a fairly high freeboard, it doesn't have the spoon-bow which is characteristic of some other Grampian models. While this 28 footer may not be as plentiful as either the Grampian 26 or 30... This boat has a nice interior layout which includes a quarter berth."

See also
List of sailing boat types

Similar sailboats
Alerion Express 28
Aloha 28
Beneteau First 285
Beneteau Oceanis 281
Bristol Channel Cutter
Cal 28
Catalina 28
Cumulus 28
Hunter 28
Hunter 28.5
Hunter 280
J/28
Laser 28
O'Day 28
Pearson 28
Sabre 28
Sea Sprite 27
Sirius 28
Tanzer 8.5
Tanzer 28
TES 28 Magnam
Viking 28

References

External links

Keelboats
1970s sailboat type designs
Sailing yachts
Sailboat type designs by Rolf van der Sleen
Sailboat types built by Grampian Marine